Martha Clare Ronk (born 1940 Cleveland, Ohio) is an American poet.

Life
She graduated from Wellesley College, and Yale University with a Ph.D. She taught at Colorado University and Otis College of Art and Design, and Naropa University Summer Writing Program. and Occidental College. She joined the Occidental faculty in 1981 and retired as a professor of English and Comparative Literary Studies in 2014.

She has lived in Los Angeles since 1971.

Awards
 2006 National Poetry Series
 2005 PEN USA award in poetry
 Lynda Hull Poetry Award
 2002 The Denver Quarterly
 Artist Residencies at the MacDowell Colony and Djerassi
 MacArthur summer Research Grant
 Mary Elvira Stevens Traveling Fellowship from Wellesley College
 Gertrude Stein Awards in Poetry
 NEA grant

Works

Poetry
Ocular Proof. Omnidawn. 2016. 
Transfer of Qualities. Omnidawn. 2013. 
"A MEMORY OF HER LODGED IN WET AIR AND SKIN"; "GETTING A HOLD"; "WHY DOES ONE DREAM OF THEM?", Jacket 13, April 2001
 
 "In a landscape of having to repeat", Poetry Foundation

Recent Terrains photographer Laurie Brown, Center for American Places, Johns Hopkins Press, 2000

 chapbook
Prepositional. Los Angeles: Mindmade Books 2004.
Quotidian chapbook, a+bend books, 2000
Allegories chapbook with artist Tom Wudl, ML & NLF Books, 1998  Emblems, chapbook, Instress, 1998

Short stories

Memoir

Ploughshares

References

External links
 Martha Ronk Papers MSS 697. Special Collections & Archives, UC San Diego Library.

1940 births
Living people
Writers from Cleveland
Wellesley College alumni
Yale University alumni
University of Colorado faculty
Otis College of Art and Design faculty
Naropa University faculty
Occidental College faculty
American women poets
Chapbook writers
American women academics
21st-century American women